Münster-Sarmsheim is an Ortsgemeinde – a municipality belonging to a Verbandsgemeinde, a kind of collective municipality – in the Mainz-Bingen district in Rhineland-Palatinate, Germany.

Geography

Location
Münster-Sarmsheim lies between Bingen and Bad Kreuznach, on the river Nahe some two kilometres upstream from where it empties into the Rhine. The winegrowing centre belongs to the Verbandsgemeinde of Rhein-Nahe, whose seat is in Bingen am Rhein, although that town is not within its bounds.

Politics

Municipal council
The council is made up of 21 council members, counting the part-time mayor, with seats apportioned thus:

(as at municipal election held on 13 June 2004)

Coat of arms
The municipality's arms might be described thus: Per fess, Or a minster with central block and wings on each side, each of the three with a gabled roof, each wing with a flanking buttress, and each roof ensigned with a cross, the one on the central block further ensigned with the head of an abbot's staff sinister sable, all windows, two in the central block and one each in the wings, and the door in the central block of the field, and gules two arrows in saltire of the first surmounted palewise by a bunch of grapes slipped vert, the grapes three, four, three, two and one.

Culture and sightseeing

Buildings
 “Stumpfer Turm” (“Blunt Tower”) castle ruin from 1493
 Old Town Hall from 1520
 Saint Peter's and Saint Paul's Catholic Parish Church from 1189
 Evangelical church from 1810
 Saint Alban's Catholic Church from 1445
 Old Tollhouse from 1710
 Timber-frame house at Saarstraße 20 from 1517
 Kruger-Rumpf Winery (founded in 1708)

Natural monuments
The Trollbachtal Nature Conservation Area harbours cliff formations from 285,000,000 years ago.

Festivals
Once a year, the kermis (church consecration festival, locally known as the Kerb) takes place in Münster-Sarmsheim. On the first weekend in August, there is celebrating, dancing and drinking. Against the backdrop of good music and Münster-Sarmsheim's local Nahe wine, the festival is each year a magnet for young and old. Traditionally, the Kerb begins on the Friday with services at Saint Peter's and Saint Paul's Church and the mayor's keg-tapping. The Kerb ends Monday evening.

Economy and infrastructure

Vineyards
 Kapellenberg, Pittersberg, Dautenpflänzer, Rheinberg

Transport
Running right through the municipality is Bundesstraße 48, which links Bad Kreuznach and Bingen am Rhein.
Autobahn A 61 can be reached after a 3 km drive at the Bingen-Mitte interchange.

Education
Münster-Sarmsheim has two kindergartens and its own primary school.

Famous people

Honorary citizens
 Prof. Theo Fischer
 Dr. Friedrich Werner

References

External links

Municipality’s official webpage 
Münster-Sarmsheim photographed from the air
Trollbachtal Nature Conservation Area 

Municipalities in Rhineland-Palatinate
Mainz-Bingen